Jang Yong (born April 8, 1945) is a South Korean actor.

Filmography

Television series

Hold Me Tight (MBC, 2018)
Our Gap-soon (SBS, 2016-2017)
Five Enough (KBS2, 2016)
Flower of Queen (MBC, 2015)
Miss Korea (MBC, 2013)
Wang's Family (KBS2, 2013)
Ad Genius Lee Tae-baek (KBS2, 2013)
My Lover, Madame Butterfly (SBS, 2012)
Golden Time (MBC, 2012)
My Husband Got a Family (KBS2, 2012)
Insu, the Queen Mother (jTBC, 2011)
Poseidon (KBS2, 2011)
Miss Ripley (MBC, 2011)
The Thorn Birds (KBS2, 2011) (cameo)
Twinkle Twinkle (MBC, 2011)
Paradise Ranch (SBS, 2011)
Please Marry Me (KBS2, 2010)
Three Sisters (SBS, 2010)
Pasta (MBC, 2010)
Cain and Abel (SBS, 2009)
The Road Home (KBS1, 2009)
My Life's Golden Age (MBC, 2008)
You Are My Destiny (KBS1, 2008)
Auction House (MBC, 2007)
Winter Bird (MBC, 2007)
Air City (MBC, 2007)
Dear Lover (SBS, 2007)
Thank You (MBC, 2007) (cameo)
A Happy Woman (KBS2, 2007)
Miracle (MBC, 2006)
Love Truly (MBC, 2006)
Goodbye Solo (KBS2, 2006)
My Rosy Life (KBS2, 2005)
A Farewell to Sorrow (KBS2, 2005)
Be Strong, Geum-soon! (MBC, 2005)
Spring Day (SBS, 2005)
Tropical Nights in December (MBC, 2004)
Oh Feel Young (KBS2, 2004)
Full House (KBS2, 2004)
Terms of Endearment (KBS2, 2004)
More Beautiful Than a Flower (KBS2, 2004)
A Problem at My Younger Brother's House (SBS, 2003)
Damo (MBC, 2003)
Perfect Love (SBS, 2003)
Cats on the Roof (MBC, 2003)
Yellow Handkerchief (KBS1, 2003)
Trio (MBC, 2002)
Like a Flowing River (SBS, 2002)
Hyun-jung, I Love You (MBC, 2002)
Sunlight Upon Me (MBC, 2002)
This is Love (KBS1, 2001)
Well Known Woman (SBS, 2001)
Flower Garden (KBS2, 2001)
The Full Sun (KBS2, 2000)
Truth (MBC, 2000)
You Don't Know My Mind (MBC, 1999)
Love In 3 Colors (KBS2, 1999)
Ad Madness (KBS2, 1999)
See and See Again (MBC, 1998)
Crush (KBS2, 1998)
Romance (SBS, 1998)
Because I Love You (SBS, 1997)
Professor and Masseur (SBS, 1997)
The Reason I Live (MBC, 1997)
마주 보며 사랑하며 (KBS2, 1997)
Emotion Generation (EBS, 1996)
Love Blooming in the Classroom II (KBS2, 1996)
Men of the Bath House (KBS2, 1995)
Thief (SBS, 1995)
String (KBS1, 1995)
Hospice Ajumma (MBC, 1995)
West Palace (KBS2, 1995)
Blue Heart Always (EBS, 1994)
Goodbye (SBS, 1994)
Outing of Forty Two (KBS2, 1993)
Always Like a Movie (KBS2, 1993)
궁합이 맞습니다 (SBS, 1992)
While You Were Dreaming (KBS2, 1990)
Carousel (KBS1, 1989)
TV's The Art of War (KBS2, 1987)
산역 (KBS2, 1987)
Honey, I'm Sorry (KBS2, 1986)
Separation Then Love (KBS2, 1986)
Criminal (KBS2, 1985)
Daughter I Like More (KBS1, 1984)
When Spring Comes (KBS1, 1984)
Daughter's Smile (KBS1, 1984)
Sleuth (KBS2, 1983)
개국 (KBS1, 1983)
지금은 사랑할 때 (KBS2, 1981)
Maechon Yarok (KBS2, 1981)
Sleuth (TBC, 1975)
Prime Minister Kim Hong-jip (TBC, 1974)

Film
Saving My Hubby (2002)
Indian Summer (2001)
Trio (1997)

References

External links

South Korean people of Chinese descent
South Korean male television actors
South Korean male film actors
Hanyang University alumni
Seoul Institute of the Arts alumni
1945 births
Living people